The following is a timeline of the history of the city of Aix-en-Provence.

Prior to 18th century

 123 BCE –  founded.
 102 BCE – Battle of Aquae Sextiae.
 1st century CE – Roman Catholic diocese of Aix established.
 477 – Visigoths in power.
 731 – Saracens in power.
 12th century – Aix Cathedral construction begins.
 1112 – Religious council held in Aix.
 1277 – Saint-Jean-de-Malte Church built.
 1409 – University founded.
 1487 – Aix becomes part of the Crown lands of France.
 1501 – Regional Parliament of Aix-en-Provence established.
 1505 – Clock tower built.
 1651 – Hôtel de Suffren built on the Cours Mirabeau.
 1667 – Pavillon Vendôme (residence) built.

18th–19th centuries

 1703 – Église de la Madeleine (Aix-en-Provence) (church) built.
 1705 – "Bathing establishment" constructed.
 1756 –  built.
 1777 – Completion of Bastide d'Orcel.
 1790
 Regional Parliament of Aix-en-Provence dissolved.
 Aix becomes part of the Bouches du Rhône souveraineté.
 1807 –  founded.
 1810 – Bibliothèque Méjanes (library) opens.
 1838
 October: Religious Council of Aix-en-Provence held.
 Musée Granet opens.
 Museum d'Histoire Naturelle Aix-en-Provence founded.
 1839 – 19 January: Birth of Paul Cézanne.
 1860 – Fontaine de la Rotonde installed.
 1881 – Population: 23,887.

20th century

 1903 – Société d'études provençales (learned society) founded.
 1906 – Population: 19,433.
 1910 – Musée des Tapisseries d'Aix-en-Provence opens.
 1911 – Musée Arbaud founded.
 1945 – Henri Mouret becomes mayor.
 1946 –  active.
 1948 – Aix-en-Provence Festival of music begins.
 1954 – Population: 54,217.
 1960 – Aix twinned with Tübingen, Germany.
 1966 – Archives Nationales d'Outre-Mer established in Aix.
 1967 - Félix Ciccolini becomes mayor.
 1968 - Population: 89,566.
 1969 - Société aixoise d'études historiques (historical society) founded.
 1970 - Aix twinned with Perugia, Italy.
 1974 – Centre de Documentation Historique sur l'Algérie headquartered in Aix.
 1975 – Population: 110,659.
 1976 –  opens.
 1977
 Aix twinned with Bath, England.
 1978 – Alain Joissains becomes mayor.
 1979 – Aix twinned with Granada, Spain.
 1982
 Canton of Aix-en-Provence-Centre created.
 Aix becomes part of the Provence-Alpes-Côte d'Azur region.
 1983 – Jean-Pierre de Peretti Della Rocca becomes mayor.
 1985 – Aix twinned with Coimbra, Portugal.
 1986 – March:  held.
 1989 – Jean-François Picheral becomes mayor.
 1992 – Aix twinned with Carthage, Tunisia.
 1995 – Aix twinned with Ashkelon, Israel.
 1999 – Population: 133,018.

21st century

 2001
 Maryse Joissains-Masini becomes mayor.
  created.
 2007 – Grand Théâtre de Provence opens.
 2011 – Population: 140,684.
 2015 – December: 2015 Provence-Alpes-Côte d'Azur regional election held.
 2016 – Metropolis of Aix-Marseille-Provence established.

See also
 
 List of mayors of Aix-en-Provence
 
 History of Provence region
  region

Other cities in the Provence-Alpes-Côte d'Azur region:
 
 Timeline of Avignon
 Timeline of Marseille
 Timeline of Nice
 Timeline of Toulon

References

This article incorporates information from the French Wikipedia.

Bibliography

in English

in French

External links

 Items related to Aix, various dates (via Europeana).
 Items related to Aix, various dates (via Digital Public Library of America).

aix
Aix-en-Provence
Years in France
aix